Gijsbert van Lennep (born 16 March 1942, in Aerdenhout, North Holland) is a Dutch racing driver who competed in eight Formula One races. However his main achievements were in sports car racing. He is a member of the untitled Dutch nobility.

Career 

Van Lennep drove for the Porsche sportscar team beginning in 1967. He shared the number 22 Martini Racing Porsche 917K with Helmut Marko, winning the 24 Hours of Le Mans in 1971. They set a distance record, covering , which remained unbeaten until 2010.

Also in 1971, the Stichting Autoraces Nederland (Foundation for Car races in the Netherlands) hired a Surtees TS7 for him to make his F1 debut in his home GP where he finished a creditable eighth in a very wet GP. The following year Van Lennep won the 1972 Rothmans European Formula 5000 Championship driving a Surtees TS11 and a McLaren M18. He also drove twice for the Williams GP team, earning his first World Championship point with sixth place in the 1973 Dutch Grand Prix. With Ensign, he scored a second point in the 1975 German Grand Prix, making him the fifth most successful Dutch Formula One driver behind Max Verstappen, Jos Verstappen, Carel Godin de Beaufort and Christijan Albers.

In 1973, he won the last Targa Florio, sharing the Martini Porsche Carrera RSR with Herbert Müller. He continued with sportscar racing, sharing a Porsche 936 Turbo with Jacky Ickx to win Le Mans 24 for a second time in 1976, before retiring from racing.

Racing record

Complete 24 Hours of Le Mans results

Complete Formula One World Championship results
(key)

Complete Formula One Non-Championship results
(key)

Complete European F5000 Championship results
(key) (Races in bold indicate pole position; races in italics indicate fastest lap.)

References

Sources

Profile at www.grandprix.com

1942 births
Living people
People from Bloemendaal
Dutch racing drivers
Dutch Formula One drivers
Williams Formula One drivers
Ensign Formula One drivers
European Formula Two Championship drivers
Jonkheers of the Netherlands
24 Hours of Le Mans drivers
24 Hours of Le Mans winning drivers
World Sportscar Championship drivers
24 Hours of Daytona drivers
Sportspeople from North Holland
Porsche Motorsports drivers